KYEZ (93.7 FM, "Y93.7") is a radio station licensed to serve Salina, Kansas, United States. The station is owned by Christopher Miller, through licensee Meridian Media, LLC.  The station was assigned the KYEZ call sign by the Federal Communications Commission.

KYEZ broadcasts a country music format. Prior to being branded Y93.7, KYEZ was branded as KY Country 94 and KY94.

References

External links

YEZ
Country radio stations in the United States
Salina, Kansas